The pale-breasted thrush (Turdus leucomelas) is a species of bird in the family Turdidae.

It is found in a wide range of wooded habitats in eastern and northern South America, from Brazil, Colombia to Uruguay, with localized population in the west.

This bird seems to have adapted to humans and is very common in human inhabited parts of its range, often nesting in garden shrubs and small trees.  In Suriname it is locally known as "Boontjedief," which means "bean thief" in Suriname Dutch, presumably based on its habit of picking off legumes left out to dry in the sun. In proper Dutch it is called "Vaalborstlijster." It is also known as "Bonka" in Sranan tongo.

In appearance it is similar to the American robin in size and shape, but it lacks the red chest and is more uniformly brown. Its song and feeding habits are also very similar to its distant cousin. In most of its range, it is more likely to be confused with the creamy-bellied thrush. Unlike the creamy-bellied thrush, the pale-breasted thrush has a clear contrast between the head and mantle, and it lacks blackish lores.

It eats mostly fruits, but also worms, insects and lizards.

References

 Birds of Suriname, François Haverschmidt, G.F.Mees, 1994 VACO N.V. P.O.Box 1841, Paramaribo, Suriname 

pale-breasted thrush
Birds of Colombia
Birds of Venezuela
Birds of the Guianas
Birds of Brazil
Birds of Paraguay
pale-breasted thrush
Taxa named by Louis Jean Pierre Vieillot
Birds of the Amazon Basin
Taxonomy articles created by Polbot